The Mauser MG 213 was a 20 mm aircraft-mounted revolver cannon developed for the Luftwaffe during World War II. It was never put into service, but the principles formed the basis for several post-war developments by the Allies. A 30 mm version was developed as the MG 213C or MK 213 and it was this that led to the British ADEN, French DEFA and American M39 cannon.

Operation
The gun was developed by Mauser but, as far as known, was never deployed. It was developed from an earlier design: the MG 213A. The MG 213A utilized a gas-driven operation. In the MG 213, the direct movement of the revolver cassette was changed to a diagonal cam with a follower. This actuated a rammer that both fed cartridges into the cylinders and revolved the cassette. Sealing was accomplished by packing the cylinder and breech with heat resistant steel. This innovation allowed chamber movement while the gas pressure was very high. The revolver cassette had five chambers and at least 3 chambers were full during operation, feeding, firing, and extracting. The cylinder was fed at the 5 o'clock position and fired at the 12 o'clock position. Upon discovery of examples of the gun, it caught the attention of autocannon developers in Switzerland, France, Britain, and the US. The British ADEN cannon was developed eight years later, while the US M39E, first designated T-160, was rushed into combat evaluation during the Korean War.

20mm MG213
Caliber: 20 x 135mm
Weight: ; assembled 
Length: 
Barrel length: 
Rate of fire: 1200–1400 rounds/min (~21 rounds/s)
Muzzle velocity:

30mm MK213
Caliber: 30 x 85R mm
Weight: ; assembled 
Length: 
Barrel length: 
Rate of fire: 1000–1200 rounds/min
Muzzle velocity:

See also
 BK 5 cannon (MK 214)
 MG 151 cannon
 MK 108 cannon

References

Further reading

20 mm artillery
Autocannon
Aircraft guns